Brisas Group is a Mexican hotel chain with 10 properties in Acapulco, Cancún, Huatulco, Irapuato, Ixtapa, Manzanillo, Mexico City, Querétaro, and Veracruz. In 2010, Travel + Leisure magazine named one of its properties, Las Brisas Acapulco, as the 7th best Mexican hotel.

History
Brisas Hotels and Resorts was created in 1991 with four properties:Las Brisas Acapulco, Galeria Plaza in Mexico City, Hacienda Jurica in Querétaro and Las Brisas Ixtapa. On year 2000 the chain added two more properties: Las Hadas Golf Resort & Marina Manzanillo and Las Brisas Huatulco. Galeria Plaza Veracruz, Nizuc in Cancun Riviera Maya is the most recent luxury resort addition.

In June 2010, owner and vice president Antonio Cosio announced an 80 million renovation effort to all Las Brisas properties

See also

 List of hotels in Mexico
 List of companies of Mexico

References

External links
 Brisas Group official site

Hotel chains in Mexico